Robert Thurston ("Bob") Dart (3 September 1921 – 6 March 1971), was an English musicologist, conductor and keyboard player. Along with Nigel Fortune, Oliver Neighbour and Stanley Sadie he was one of Britain's leading musicologists of the post-World War II generation. From 1964 until his death he was King Edward Professor of Music at the University of London, based at King's College London.

Early life 
Dart was born on 3 September 1921 in Surbiton, then part of Surrey. His father, Henry Thurston Dart, married his mother, Elisabeth Martha (née Orf) in 1915. Dart attended Hampton Grammar School and he sang in the choir at Hampton Court.

Dart studied keyboard instruments at the Royal College of Music in London from 1938 to 1939, and then studied mathematics at University College, Exeter, being awarded his degree in 1942. He served as a Junior Scientific Officer and then as a statistician and researcher for the RAF Strategic Bombing Planning Unit under Air Vice Marshall Basil Embry from 1942 to 1945. Dart was injured in a plane crash in Calais in November 1944, and while convalescing from his injuries at a nursing home in Swanley, he first met Neville Marriner. After leaving the services, he studied for a year with Belgian musicologist , returning to England in 1946 as research assistant to Henry Moule, a music lecturer at Cambridge University.

Musical career 
In 1947 he was appointed assistant lecturer in music in the University of Cambridge, subsequently lecturer (1952) and professor (1962). During this time, Dart was the most effective British supporter of the modern early music revival, in part through his influence on those who ultimately formed such groups as the Early Music Consort of London. In 1964 he was appointed King Edward Professor of Music at the University of London, based at King's College London.

As a continuo player, Dart made numerous appearances on the harpsichord and made many harpsichord, clavichord and organ recordings, especially for the L'Oiseau-Lyre label; he was also a conductor. He served as editor of the Galpin Society Journal from 1947 to 1954 and secretary of Musica Britannica from 1950 to 1965. His book, The Interpretation of Music (London, 1954), was highly influential and is still widely read; he also wrote numerous seminal articles on aspects of musical sources, performance and interpretation.

During the 1950s he participated in annual concerts featuring four harpsichordists, the three others being George Malcolm, Denis Vaughan and Eileen Joyce. In 1957 this group also recorded Bach's Concerto for Four Harpsichords, an arrangement after Vivaldi, with the Pro Arte Orchestra under Boris Ord.  They also recorded Malcolm's Variations on a Theme of Mozart.

Dart's distinguished students included the composer Michael Nyman, harpsichordist Davitt Moroney, conductor Sir John Eliot Gardiner and conductor/musicologist Christopher Hogwood. He made one of the first historically informed recordings of the Brandenburg Concertos with the Philomusica of London. He later worked with Neville Marriner on a recording of the Brandenburg Concerti and the four Orchestral Suites though Dart died from stomach cancer on 6 March 1971 before this was complete.

Legacy 
In 1996 or 1997 the Thurston Dart Professorship of Music was established at Kings College London.

Notes

Further reading 
Bent, Ian, ed. (1981). Source materials and the interpretation of music: a memorial volume to Thurston Dart. London: Stainer & Bell. .

External links 
 
 Thurston Dart on Bach Cantatas Website
 

1921 births
1971 deaths
British harpsichordists
Bach conductors
Academics of King's College London
Alumni of the Royal College of Music
British performers of early music
Members of the University of Cambridge Faculty of Music
20th-century conductors (music)
20th-century British musicians
20th-century British musicologists
Royal Air Force personnel of World War II
Royal Air Force officers
Deaths from stomach cancer
Deaths from cancer in England
Professors of Music (Cambridge)